The 1935 Prince Edward Island general election was held in the Canadian province of Prince Edward Island on 23 July 1935. The Liberal Party led by Walter Lea swept the board by winning every seat in every constituency. This was the first time that a government in the British Commonwealth would face no opposition in an elected chamber. To date, this feat has only been accomplished one other time in Canadian history, the 1987 New Brunswick election.

Background
The 1935 election took place in the shadow of the Great Depression. In 1931, the Conservative Party, then under James David Stewart, defeated the incumbent Liberal government, installing Stewart as Premier. As Premier, Stewart worked to get federal assistance in combating the Depression, but stress caused him to die in office in 1933.

When Stewart's health was failing, he was replaced by Acting Premier William J. P. MacMillan, who took over for Stewart upon his death. MacMillan continued Stewart's policies of increased economic spending and government assistance, until the election in 1935.

Walter Lea, a farmer by trade, had been elected to the Legislature in 1915, and had been Premier before Stewart from 1930–31. During his time as Premier, he "undertook many initiatives to improve and diversify the island’s agricultural industry". After his loss to James Stewart, he continued in opposition until 1935. By the time the 1935 election came around, Lea was very ill. He coordinated most of the campaign "from a hospital bed for six weeks, and then from his home for the remainder of the election. He made only one public appearance during the entire campaign".

Results

The Liberal Party, under Lea, won all 30 seats in the House of Assembly, a feat that had never been accomplished before in the Commonwealth. News media across the Commonwealth broadcast the story. When faced with this unusual institutional setup, Lea had several members of his own party act as members of the opposition, as an actual opposition party did not exist within the legislature. This step was also used in the New Brunswick Legislative Assembly after the 1987 election, in which the New Brunswick Liberal Party won all 58 seats in the Legislative Assembly.

Lea died a few months into his mandate, and was replaced by Thane Campbell, who served as Premier until 1943.

Members
The Legislature of Prince Edward Island had two levels of membership from 1893 to 1996 - Assemblymen and Councillors. This was a holdover from when the Island had a bicameral legislature, the General Assembly and the Legislative Council.

In 1893, the Legislative Council was abolished and had its membership merged with the Assembly, though the two titles remained separate and were elected by different electoral franchises. Assembleymen were elected by all eligible voters of within a district, while Councillors were only elected by landowners within a district.

Kings

Queens

Prince

References

Further reading
 

1935 elections in Canada
Elections in Prince Edward Island
1935 in Prince Edward Island
July 1935 events